Esenguly (formerly Hasan-Kuly,  Gasan-Kuli) is a city in and administrative center of Esenguly District, Balkan Province, Turkmenistan. In 1989 its population was 5,823.

Etymology
The name is of obscure origin. A clan of that name, part of the Yomud tribe, exists, but local elders have stated the name is of a long-dead person.

Geography

Esenguly lies on a flat, barren plain, just off the coast of the Caspian Sea.

Climate
Esenguly has a desert climate (Köppen climate classification BWk), with cool winters and hot summers. Temperatures are not as extreme as other parts of Turkmenistan due to the town's proximity to the Caspian Sea. Precipitation is low, but is highest in winter and lowest in summer.

Transportation

A road leads north to Çekişler and Ekarem. Route P-16 connects these towns to Gumdag. Another road to the east connects the town to Ajiyap, Çaloýuk, Garadegiş and Akyayla, from which route P-15 leads to Etrek and Magtymguly, and also to Gyzylarbat.

References

 

Populated places in Balkan Region